Rede Wood is a 7.5 hectare Local Nature Reserve east of Claydon in Suffolk, England. It was formerly owned by Suffolk County Council, which sold it to a private owner in 2012. It is managed under an agreement between the owner and the council.

This semi-natural wood on boulder clay is mainly pedunculate oak and ash, with a coppiced understorey mainly of hazel. The flora includes 38 species indicative of ancient woodland.

There is access by footpaths from Claydon and Henley.

References

Local Nature Reserves in Suffolk
Barham, Suffolk
Forests and woodlands of Suffolk